The 2017 IAAF World Challenge was the eighth edition of the annual, global circuit of one-day track and field competitions organized by the International Association of Athletics Federations (IAAF). The series featured a total of nine meetings – three fewer than the previous year as the Rieti Meeting, Melbourne Track Classic, Meeting Grand Prix IAAF de Dakar and IAAF World Challenge Beijing all dropped out and the only new addition was the Paavo Nurmi Games. The Rieti Meeting was originally scheduled for 3 September, but the meeting folded due to financial issues.

Schedule

References

External links
Official website

2017
World Challenge Meetings